Dylan Mottley-Henry (born 2 August 1997) is an English professional footballer who plays for South Shields as a winger.

Career

Bradford City
Mottley-Henry played youth football for Bradford City, joining the first-team in November 2014. He made his senior debut for the club on 6 April 2015, appearing as a substitute in a league match. In May 2015 he was one of four youth players offered professional contracts with the club.

He moved on loan to Altrincham in January 2016, making six appearances. He joined Bradford Park Avenue on loan in February 2016, alongside Reece Webb-Foster.

Barnsley
He was released by Bradford City at the end of the 2015–16 season. He then went on trial with Barnsley in July 2016, signing a six-month contract with them later that month. He signed on loan for Tranmere Rovers in October 2017, and for Chesterfield in January 2018. He returned to Tranmere Rovers on loan in August 2018. He moved on loan to Harrogate Town in February 2019.

Return to Bradford City
After being released by Barnsley, Mottley-Henry re-signed for Bradford on a six-month contract on 30 January 2020. He quickly became a first-team regular under new manager Stuart McCall. He was released by the club on 30 April 2020, although the club said he might still be part of their plans after the COVID-19 pandemic ended and league football resumed. He was offered a new contract by Bradford City in July 2020, and he signed for the club for a third time later that month on a one-year deal. He said he appreciated McCall's faith in him, and that he wanted to become a first-team regular in the 2020–21 season. He suffered an injury in a pre-season friendly. On 31 January 2021 it was announced that he had left the club.

Later career
On 1 February 2021 he signed for Northern Ireland club Larne. In June 2021 it was announced that he would leave the club at the end of the month, following the expiry of his contract.

In September 2021 he returned to Bradford Park Avenue on a short-term deal.

In June 2022, Mottley-Henry joined Northern Premier League Premier Division club South Shields.

Career statistics

References

1997 births
Living people
English footballers
Association football wingers
Bradford City A.F.C. players
Altrincham F.C. players
Bradford (Park Avenue) A.F.C. players
Barnsley F.C. players
Tranmere Rovers F.C. players
Chesterfield F.C. players
Harrogate Town A.F.C. players
Larne F.C. players
South Shields F.C. (1974) players
English Football League players
National League (English football) players
NIFL Premiership players